Pericalus is a genus of beetles in the family Carabidae, containing the following species:

Species
 Pericalus acutidens Shi & Liang, 2018
 Pericalus aeneipennis Louwerens, 1964 
 Pericalus amplus Andrewes, 1937 
 Pericalus angusticollis Baehr, 1994 
 Pericalus atricornis Baehr, 1994 
 Pericalus cicindeloides W.S.Macleay, 1825 
 Pericalus cordicollis Andrewes, 1931 
 Pericalus cuprascens Baehr, 1994 
 Pericalus depressus Andrewes, 1926 
 Pericalus distinctus Dupuis, 1913
 Pericalus dux Andrewes, 1920 
 Pericalus elegans Shi & Liang, 2018
 Pericalus fascinator Andrewes, 1937 
 Pericalus figuratus Chaudoir, 1861 
 Pericalus formosanus Dupuis, 1913
 Pericalus funestus Andrewes, 1926 
 Pericalus gibbosus Shi & Liang, 2018
 Pericalus gratus Schaum, 1861 
 Pericalus guttatus Chevrolat, 1832 
 Pericalus imitator Baehr, 2000 
 Pericalus klapperichi Jedlicka, 1953  
 Pericalus laetus Schaum, 1860 
 Pericalus levifrons Heller, 1916 
 Pericalus longicollis Chaudoir, 1869 
 Pericalus magnus Baehr, 1994 
 Pericalus nigripes Baehr, 2000 
 Pericalus novaeirlandiae Baehr, 2003 
 Pericalus obscuratus Shi & Liang, 2018
 Pericalus ornatus Schmidt-Gobel, 1846
 Pericalus philippinus Heller, 1916 
 Pericalus picturatus Chaudoir, 1869 
 Pericalus quadrimaculatus (W.S.Macleay, 1825) 
 Pericalus robustus Baehr, 1994 
 Pericalus signatus Jedlicka, 1936 
 Pericalus tetrastigma Chaudoir, 1861 
 Pericalus undatus Chaudoir, 1848 
 Pericalus violaceus Andrewes, 1926
 Pericalus xanthopus Schaum, 1860

References

Lebiinae
Carabidae genera